Killalea State Park is a state park in New South Wales, Australia.

History and Facilities
The park has camping and beach facilities. Entry is free. In June 2011, the Killalea State Park Trust, which manages the park, proposed instating an entry fee to allow the park to expand and improve its services.

In 2009, the Killalea Reserve was declared a national surfing reserve with a vision to preserve this unique surfing break for future generations.

References

External links
Official site

Parks in New South Wales